Patrick Faber may refer to:

 Patrick Faber (field hockey), Dutch hockey player
Patrick Faber (politician), Belizean politician